Wild Boy, or variants, may refer to:

People
Wild Boy of Aveyron (c. 1788–1828), French boy found living wild in the woods
Peter the Wild Boy (died 1785), boy from Hanover found living wild in the woods

Books
Wild Boy (novel) 2003 novel by Jill Dawson, fictional retelling of the story of Victor, the Wild Boy of Aveyron
The Wild Boy, 2001 science fiction novel by Warren Rochelle
 The Wild Boys (novel), a 1971 novel by William S. Burroughs about an apocalyptic gay youth gang
 The Wild Boys, a 1979 British play by Peter Richardson, based on the William S. Burroughs novel
 Wild Boy, play about autism by Oliver Goldstick 2016
 Wild Boy of the Woods, from List of Beano comic strips by annual
Wildboys (comics), fictional characters in the Marvel Universe

Film and TV
Wild Boy (film), 1934 British film comedy about greyhound betting
The Wild Child, (French: L'Enfant sauvage UK: The Wild Boy) 1970 French film by director François Truffaut about the child Victor of Aveyron
Bigfoot and Wildboy, live action children's television series on ABC, from 1976 part of The Krofft Supershow on Saturday mornings
Wildboyz, a 2003 MTV reality TV series, American spin-off television series and follow-up to Jackass
 Wild Boys, a 2011 Australian TV drama series from the Seven Network about bushrangers in 1860s' colonial New South Wales

Music
 "Wild Boy", a 2011 single by Machine Gun Kelly
 "The Wild Boys", a 1984 single by Duran Duran, named after the novel

Other
Wild Boy and Puppy, porcelain sculpture featuring a yellow cartoon dog, a "wild boy" with red spiky hair, and a bumblebee